Brickaville is a town and commune in Atsinanana Region, Madagascar.

Also known as Ampasimanolotra, Brickaville is located along Route nationale 2 (RN 2), 105 km south of Toamasina (the primary seaport of the country) and 220 km east of Antananarivo (the capital).  It is also situated alongside the Rianila river. It is a railway station on the Antananarivo - East Coast line.

Its only industry is a sugar refinery plant.  It had stopped its production for 13 years but took up operations in 2020.

References

Populated places in Atsinanana